David George Marr (born September 22, 1937) is an American/Australian historian specializing in the modern history of Vietnam.

Marr was born in Macon, Georgia, the son of Henry George (an auditor) and Louise M. (a teacher; maiden name Brown). Marr studied at Dartmouth College (BA), before joining the US Marine Corps as an intelligence officer. Marr learned Vietnamese in the US, then was assigned to Vietnam in 1962. He married there in April 1963, and was reassigned to marine Intelligence in Hawaii a month later. After leaving the Marines in 1964 he sought to understand the roots of Vietnamese patriotism as a graduate student at UC Berkeley (PhD 1968). He taught at University of California, Berkeley and as assistant professor at Cornell University, 1969–72, while becoming increasingly engaged in documenting the case for withdrawing from Viet Nam, notably as co-director of the Indochina Resource Center (Washington and Berkeley), 1971-5. In 1975 he moved to Australia with his family, in research positions as Fellow, Senior Fellow and finally Professor at the Australian National University's Research School of Pacific Studies, in Canberra. He has also been editor of Vietnam Today.  He is currently Emeritus Professor and Visiting Fellow, School of Culture, History & Language at the College of Asia and the Pacific, Australian National University.

Publications
 Vietnamese Anticolonialism 1885–1925, University of California Press, 1971
 Vietnamese Tradition on Trial, 1920–1945, University of California Press, 1981.
 Vietnam 1945: The Quest for Power, University of California Press, 1995.
 Vietnam: State, War, and Revolution (1945–1946), University of California Press, 2013.
 Perceptions of the Past in Southeast Asia, co-edited along with Anthony Reid, Heinemann, 1979.
 Vietnam. World Bibliographical Series, vol.147, Clio Press, 1992.

References

 David G. Marr (2007). "A Life with Vietnam", in Nicholas Tarling (ed.), Historians and Their Discipline: the Call of Southeast Asian History. Malaysian Branch of the Royal Asiatic Society.

Further reading

External links
 "Prof. David G. Marr" – Australian National University (College of Asia and the Pacific).

21st-century American historians
21st-century American male writers
Historians of the Vietnam War
Living people
1937 births
Cornell University faculty
American male non-fiction writers